Eleutherodactylus dolomedes (common names: Hispaniolan ventriloquial frog, Hedge's  robber frog, Hedges' robber frog) is a species of frog in the family Eleutherodactylidae. It is endemic to the Massif de la Hotte, Haiti.

Description
The type series consists of three adult males that measure  in snout–vent length; the heaviest specimen weighs . The snout is subacuminate and short. The tympanum is small and round. All fingers and toes have expanded tips but no webbing.  Skin is dorsally and laterally moderately tuberculate; the venter grades from being smooth anteriorly to tuberculate posteriorly. The dorsal ground color is orange-brown or orange-tan. There is one scapular and one midbody brown, ill-defined chevron. Narrow, light, dorsolateral stripes may be present. Limbs are marked with gray bars. Males have a single, external vocal sac.

The call itself is a rapid, seven-note, high-pitched series of "chirps", with the dominant frequency of about 4.7 kHz.

Habitat and conservation
It is only known from one site within the Pic Macaya National Park. However, there is no active management for conservation, and habitat loss continues in the park.

References

dolomedes
Amphibians of Haiti
Endemic fauna of Haiti
Amphibians described in 1992
Taxa named by Stephen Blair Hedges
Taxa named by Richard Thomas (herpetologist)
Taxonomy articles created by Polbot